The Old German Baptist Brethren, New Conference is a church belonging to the Schwarzenau Brethren tradition, that formed in 2009 as a result of a split among the Old German Baptist Brethren.

History

In 2009, a major division was a result of the rejection, by a large percentage of members (approximately 2,400 individuals), of an unprecedented committee report adopted by the 2009 Annual Meeting held near Waterford, CA. The report stated in part, "Members of the Old German Baptist Brethren Church in full fellowship and in good standing with the Church, believe and agree that the Old German Baptist Brethren’s interpretation of NT doctrine is scriptural and has been prompted by the Holy Spirit and it is their mind to remain in this fellowship and to teach, support and promote the unity of the Spirit in the bond of peace. It will be expected that members hearing the reading of this report will be willing to accept the same."

No positions on specific questions of doctrine or church practice before the Conference were addressed in the Report, though the general understanding was that it asked for an affirmation of loyalty to traditional doctrine and practice as interpreted by the more traditional/conservative arm of membership. Conference representatives were sent to each district (congregation) in the brotherhood to determine the willingness of each member to accept the report. Those who refused to accept the report gave their names, which were recorded and sent to the secretary of the standing committee for processing, and they were disfellowshipped (ie excommunicated). Members who refused to accept the Report were given 60 days to reconsider their decision without repercussion. Those who remained silent or did not attend the meetings were assumed to be in agreement or willing to submit to the decision, and were retained as members.

A majority of the members who did not accept the Report and were subsequently disfellowshipped participated in the re-organization of a new body, which was organized at a July 3, 2009, meeting in Troy, Ohio, called the Old German Baptist Brethren, New Conference. Several fundamental disagreements identified by the New Conference and adherents included: allowing regular group Bible studies outside of the Sunday worship setting; permitting open outreach & mission efforts; use of email and the Internet; Scriptural application of church discipline as guided by Matthew 18; and preservation of the historical Brethren practice of decision-making by "taking the voice" (or vote) of every member, whereas no discussion was permitted upon presentation of the 2009 Report, and only a vote of affirmation was permitted.

The New Conference Original Polity Statement, declares that "the church must never be elevated to a place of equality with Jesus Christ," reflecting the New Conference's somewhat more individualistic approach to faith, following personal Biblical convictions (in opposition to the parent body's stronger emphasis on unity through mutual accountability and top-down legislating practical applications of theology). The 2018 Conference approved an updated Polity Statement. The majority of the remainder of the departing members have joined similar existing groups such as the Old Brethren, Dunkard Brethren, or moved on to more mainstream evangelical church fellowships.

References
 Charles D. Thompson Jr.: The Old German Baptist Brethren: Faith, Farming, and Change in the Virginia Blue Ridge, (2006) University of Illinois Press.
 Carl F. Bowman: Brethren Society: The Cultural Transformation of a Peculiar People, (1995) Johns Hopkins University Press.
 Donald B. Kraybill and Carl D. Bowman: On the Backroad to Heaven: Old Order Hutterites, Mennonites, Amish, and Brethren, (2001) Johns Hopkins University Press.
 Marcus Miller: Roots by the River, (1973) Independently Published.
 Donald F. Durnbaugh, (editor): Brethren Encyclopedia, Vol. I-III, (1983) The Brethren Encyclopedia Inc.
 Donald F. Durnbaugh and Dale V. Ulrich (editors), Carl Bowman, contributing editor: Brethren Encyclopedia, Vol. IV, (2006) The Brethren Encyclopedia Inc.
 Donald F. Durnbaugh: Fruit of the Vine, A History of the Brethren 1708-1995, (1997) Brethren Press.
 Michael Hari: Brethren Thinking, (2011) Der Bruederbote Press.
 Donald B. Kraybill and C. Nelson Hostetter: Anabaptist World USA, (2001) Herald Press.
 Gerald J. Mast: The Old German Baptist Brethren Church Division of 2009: The Debate over the Internet and the Authority of the Annual Meeting in The Mennonite Quarterly Review 2014, pages 45-64.

Notes

External links
Official website of the Old German Baptist Brethren Church, New Conference
Pietism  - an overview of Pietism, of which the Brethren Movement is a part.
About German Baptists

Anabaptist organizations
Brethren denominations in North America